St. Adalbert Polish Catholic Church is a historic church at 1511 Valley Street in Dayton, Ohio.
 
On Sunday, April 30, 1905,St. Adalbert Church was dedicated by Archbishop Henry K. Moeller of Cincinnati.

In 1954, parishioners build a new rectory and grotto shrine at the church.

In 1961, preparations began for the building of a new St. Adalbert's church.  On Holy Thursday, March 23, 1967, the first mass was held at the new church. It was dedicated on the Feast of St. Adalbert, April 23, 1967.

In 2016, the old church building was sold by the Archdiocese of Cincinnati and converted into a madrasah for the neighboring Diyanet mosque

See also
National Register of Historic Places listings in Dayton, Ohio

References

Roman Catholic churches in Dayton, Ohio
Polish-American culture in Ohio
Roman Catholic churches completed in 1904
National Register of Historic Places in Montgomery County, Ohio
Churches on the National Register of Historic Places in Ohio
Neoclassical architecture in Ohio
Romanesque Revival church buildings in Ohio
20th-century Roman Catholic church buildings in the United States
Neoclassical church buildings in the United States